Atractus lasallei, Lasalle's ground snake,  is a species of snake in the family Colubridae. The species can be found in Colombia.

References 

Atractus
Reptiles of Colombia
Endemic fauna of Colombia
Reptiles described in 1931